Wal-Mart v. Dukes, 564 U.S. 338 (2011), was a United States Supreme Court case in which the Court ruled that a group of roughly 1.5 million women could not be certified as a valid class of plaintiffs in a class-action lawsuit for employment discrimination against Walmart. Lead plaintiff Betty Dukes, a Walmart employee, and others alleged gender discrimination in pay and promotion policies and practices in Walmart stores.

The Court agreed to hear argument on whether Federal Rule of Civil Procedure, Rule 23(b)(2), which provides for class-actions if the defendant's actions make injunctive relief appropriate, can be used to file a class action that demands monetary damages. The Court also asked the parties to argue whether the class meets the traditional requirements of numerosity, commonality, typicality, and adequacy of representation.

The Supreme Court ruled unanimously that the class should not be certified in its current form but was only 5–4 on why so and whether the class could continue in a different form.

Background 
In 2000, Betty Dukes, a 54-year-old Walmart worker in California, claimed sex discrimination. Despite six years of work and positive performance reviews, she was denied the training she needed to advance to a higher salaried position. Walmart argued that Dukes clashed with a female Walmart supervisor and was disciplined for admittedly returning late from lunch breaks.

In June 2001, the lawsuit began in US District Court in San Francisco. The plaintiffs sought to represent 1.6 million women, including women who were currently working or who had previously worked in a Walmart store since December 26, 1998.

Federal District Court
In June 2004, the federal district judge, Martin Jenkins, ruled in favor of class certification under the Federal Rules of Civil Procedure 23(b)(2). Walmart appealed the decision.

Court of Appeals
On February 6, 2007, a three-judge panel of the Ninth Circuit affirmed the district court's class certification. Judge Harry Pregerson wrote for the majority, which also included Judge Michael Daly Hawkins. Judge Andrew J. Kleinfeld dissented and criticized the majority's view of the class certification standards.

Walmart promptly filed for a rehearing and a rehearing en banc, contending that the majority committed legal error with regard to whether the grounds for class action certification had been met.

On December 11, 2007, the same Ninth Circuit panel withdrew its initial opinion and issued a subsequent, superseding opinion, which still permitted the class certification. The panel dismissed the original petition for rehearing as moot in light of its superseding opinion, on the grounds that the revised opinion addresses the legal errors claimed in the petition, but Walmart was permitted to refile its petition. Among other changes to its original opinion, the Ninth Circuit altered its opinion with respect to the admissibility of expert testimony and the use of Daubert challenges during a motion for class certification. Walmart again filed for a rehearing en banc.

On February 13, 2009, the Ninth Circuit granted Walmart's petition for rehearing en banc on the class action certification. As a result, the December 2007 Ninth Circuit opinion was no longer effective.

On March 24, 2009 a panel of eleven Ninth Circuit judges, led by Chief Judge Alex Kozinski, heard oral arguments for the En Banc appeal. On April 26, 2010, the en banc court affirmed the district court's class certification on a 6-5 vote, with Judge Michael Daly Hawkins writing for the majority and Judge Sandra Segal Ikuta writing for the dissent.

Walmart's lead appellate counsel, Theodore Boutrous, Jr., said in a statement that the decision violates "both due process and federal class action rules, contradicting numerous decisions of other federal appellate courts and the Supreme Court itself" and indicated that Walmart would appeal to the Supreme Court. Plaintiffs' counsel argued that "Wal-Mart is attempting to dismantle the Supreme Court's employment discrimination class action jurisprudence [that] would require the Court to overrule 45 years of civil rights and class action precedent."

Supreme Court decision
On December 6, 2009, the Supreme Court agreed to hear Walmart's appeal as Wal-Mart v. Dukes. Oral argument for the case occurred on March 29, 2011.

On June 20, 2011, the Supreme Court ruled in Walmart's favor by saying the plaintiffs did not have enough in common to constitute a class. The Court ruled unanimously that because of the variability of plaintiffs' circumstances, the class action could not proceed as comprised.

The Court ruled 5–4 that it could not proceed as any kind of class action suit. Critics of the opinion allege that the decision makes it incredibly difficult to certify a class without a prohibitive amount of work on the part of plaintiff attorneys. The requirement to look through the class to the merits requires an immense amount of discovery, which was not previously required.

See also 
 Criticism of Walmart
 Gender equality
 List of class action lawsuits
 List of gender equality lawsuits
 Mauldin v. Wal-Mart Stores, Inc.

Notes

External links
 
 Ninth Circuit's en banc decision
 Coverage of the case by SCOTUSblog
 Onthedocket.org's coverage of the case

Gender discrimination lawsuits
United States class action case law
United States Supreme Court cases
United States Supreme Court cases of the Roberts Court
Walmart litigation
2011 in United States case law